RFA Olmeda (A124) was an Ol-class "fast fleet tanker" of the Royal Fleet Auxiliary. The ship was renamed from Oleander after two years in operation.

In the last action of the Falklands War, Olmeda helped recapture the South Sandwich Islands.

Background
The second of her class, Olmeda came into service in late 1965 as Oleander. As with its sister ships, Olmeda's early service was routine.

Operational history

1973
In the Second Cod War, Olmeda supported Royal Navy ships twice.

Falklands War
Olmeda saw extensive service during the Falklands War, being one of the first ships to head south.  Olmeda refuelled numerous ships of the Task Force including HMS Hermes, HMS Invincible, and the SS Uganda.

After the Argentine surrender of the Falkland Islands, Olmeda,  and the tug Salvageman sailed to the South Sandwich Islands where Argentina had established a base in South Thule since 1976. Following a demonstration of Yarmouths guns, the ten Argentine military personnel surrendered. Before leaving South Thule, Yarmouth was refueled by Olmeda on 21 June, which may have been the most southerly Underway replenishment in the history of the Royal Navy.

Decommissioning

In 1993, the ship was decommissioned and sold for scrap. Breaking up commenced at Alang on 23 December 1994.

References

1964 ships
Ol-class tankers (1965)
Falklands War naval ships of the United Kingdom
Falklands War in South Georgia
Ships built on the River Tyne